This is a comprehensive list of the United States national soccer team's competitive, individual, team, and head-to-head records.

Individual records

Player records

.
Players in bold are still active for selection for the national team.

Coaching records

 Most coaching appearances
 Bruce Arena: 148

Team records 
 Biggest victory
 8–0 vs. Barbados, June 15, 2008

Competition records

The U.S. regularly competes at the FIFA World Cup, the CONCACAF Gold Cup, and the Summer Olympics. The U.S. has also played in the FIFA Confederations Cup, Copa América by invitation, as well as several minor tournaments.

The best result for the United States in a World Cup tournament came in 1930 when the team reached the semifinals. The team was composed of six naturalized internationals, five of them from Scotland and one from England. The best result in the modern era is the 2002 World Cup, when the U.S. reached the quarterfinals. The worst world Cup tournament results in the modern era were group stage eliminations in 1990, 1998, and 2006, although the country failed to even qualify for the final tournament in 2018.

In the Confederations Cup, the United States finished in third place in both 1992 and 1999, and were runner-up in 2009. The United States appeared in their first intercontinental tournament final at the 2009 Confederations Cup. In the semifinals, the United States upset top ranked Spain 2–0, to advance to the final. In the final, the United States lost 3–2 to Brazil after leading 2–0 at halftime.

The U.S. men's soccer team have played in the Summer Olympics since 1924. From that tournament to 1980, only amateur and state-sponsored Eastern European players were allowed on Olympic teams. The Olympics became a full international tournament in 1984 after the IOC allowed full national teams from outside FIFA CONMEBOL & UEFA confederations. Ever since 1992 the men's Olympic event has been age-restricted, under 23 plus three overage players, and participation has been by the United States men's national under-23 soccer team.

In regional competitions, the United States has won the CONCACAF Gold Cup seven times, with their most recent title in 2021. Their best ever finish at the Copa América was fourth-place at the 1995 and 2016 editions.

FIFA World Cup

CONCACAF Gold Cup

CONCACAF Championship 1963–1989, CONCACAF Gold Cup 1991–present

Summer Olympics

Copa América

South American Championship 1916–1967, Copa América 1975–present

FIFA Confederations Cup

CONCACAF Nations League

Head-to-head record 
The following tables summarizes the all-time record for the United States men's national soccer team, first broken down by confederation and then the team's head-to-head record by decade. The United States has played matches against 102 current and former national teams, with the latest result, a draw, coming against Colombia on January 28, 2023.

Through United States vs. Colombia on January 28, 2023.

AFC (16–11–8)

CAF (11–6–2)

CONCACAF (215–90–78)

CONMEBOL (28–57–29)

OFC (2–0–1)

UEFA (58–96–44)

Record timeline 

 Win %: number of wins divided by number of games played (ties each count as half of a win)

Notes

References

External links 
 U.S. Men's National Soccer Team List of Results
 https://www.worldfootball.net/teams/usa-team/21/

United States men's national soccer team records and statistics
National association football team records and statistics